The Château de Respide is a château in Langon, Gironde, located in Nouvelle-Aquitaine, France.

Châteaux in Gironde